is a former Japanese football player.

Playing career
Iwamoto was born in Kagoshima Prefecture on June 27, 1970. After graduating from Rissho University, he joined Japan Football League club Fujita Industries (later Bellmare Hiratsuka) in 1993. He played many matches as mainly right and left side back. The club won the champions in 1993 and was promoted to J1 League from 1994. From 1994, the club won the champions 1994 Emperor's Cup and 1995 Asian Cup Winners' Cup. Although his opportunity to play decreased from 1996, he became a regular player in 1998 again. However he was released the club due to their financial problems end of 1998 season. In 1999, he moved to newly was promoted to J2 League club, Montedio Yamagata. He played as regular player in 2 seasons and he retired end of 2000 season.

Club statistics

References

External links

1970 births
Living people
Rissho University alumni
Association football people from Kagoshima Prefecture
Japanese footballers
Japan Soccer League players
J1 League players
J2 League players
Japan Football League (1992–1998) players
Shonan Bellmare players
Montedio Yamagata players
Association football defenders